Mirasəfli is a village and municipality in the Barda Rayon of Azerbaijan. It has a population of 283.

References

Populated places in Barda District